Trusten W. Polk (May 29, 1811April 16, 1876) served as the 12th Governor of Missouri in 1857 and U.S. Senator from 1857 to 1862.

Biography
Polk was born in Bridgeville, Delaware. A Democrat, he was elected Governor of Missouri in 1856 and served from January 5, 1857, until February 27 when he resigned to become a U.S. Senator. Hancock Lee Jackson succeeded him as governor until the election of Robert Marcellus Stewart.

Polk was expelled from the U.S. Senate January 10, 1862, for his support of the South in the American Civil War. He was appointed as a colonel in the Missouri State Guard under the command of Confederate General Sterling Price, and later served as a judge in the military courts of the Department of Mississippi in 1864 and 1865.

After the war, Polk was a lawyer in St. Louis, Missouri. He is buried there in Bellefontaine Cemetery following his death on April 16, 1876, aged 64.

See also
 List of United States senators expelled or censured

References

External links
 Retrieved on 2008-02-14

Trusten Polk at the National Governors Association

|-

|-

1811 births
1876 deaths
1848 United States presidential electors
19th-century American Episcopalians
19th-century American lawyers
19th-century American politicians
American Civil War prisoners of war
Burials at Bellefontaine Cemetery
Expelled United States senators
Confederate States Army officers
Democratic Party governors of Missouri
Democratic Party United States senators from Missouri
Missouri lawyers
People from Bridgeville, Delaware
People of Missouri in the American Civil War
Trusten
Yale Law School alumni
Southern Historical Society